William Terence Kirby (born January 2, 1973), popularly known as Dr. Will, is an American aesthetic dermatologist, an associate clinical professor of dermatology, and a reality television personality. He is known for winning the CBS reality show Big Brother 2 as well as winning The Price Is Right and appearing on Star Wars television series The Book of Boba Fett.

Early life
Kirby was born on January 2, 1973, in Florence, Italy. He attended kindergarten in Paris, France and spent time in his youth in Tallahassee, Florida, where he graduated from Florida State University School in 1991.

Medical career
In 1995, Kirby received his degree in biology from Emory University. He received his medical degree from Nova Southeastern University College of Osteopathic Medicine in 2000. He is the Chief Medical Officer at LaserAway, an aesthetic dermatology group. Kirby lectures at national medical conventions and has published dermatology articles in The Journal of Cosmetic Dermatology, is an expert in the field of laser tattoo removal, and authored the first predictive scale to assess the number of laser treatments to remove a tattoo (Kirby-Desai Scale).  He has also authored and co-authored medical textbook chapters regarding lasers and their implications as well as medicolegal considerations and medical ethics. Kirby served as the national spokesman for Johnson & Johnson's Neutrogena Dermatologics where he appeared on live on QVC.

Entertainment career
Kirby won the second season of CBS's Big Brother in 2001. He also briefly served as a medical correspondent for Extra!. In 2002 he hosted a dating show for NBC called Love Shack. In 2005, he appeared on six episodes of Bravo's Battle of The Network Reality Stars and appeared on two seasons Dr. 90210. He has also appeared on The Young and the Restless,  Regis & Kelly, The Talk, LA Ink, Chelsea Lately, and has made several appearances on The Doctors as himself. Kirby has recorded voices for a season eight episode of Adult Swim's Robot Chicken where he played an animated physician and he appeared in two season's of Then and Now on Bravo.  In 2019, Kirby was named as the health and beauty reporter for pop culture magazine Life and Style. In 2022, he plays "Karales the Bounty Hunter" on the Star Wars television series The Book of Boba Fett.

Personal life
Kirby's father is the American poet, David Kirby. In 2011, Kirby became engaged to Erin Brodie, who was a two-time winner of the reality series For Love or Money. They were married in 2017. Kirby and Brodie have two children: their son William was born in 2010 and in 2012 Brodie gave birth to the couple's daughter named Scarlett.

References

External links
 

1973 births
Big Brother (American TV series) winners
Living people
Emory University alumni
Nova Southeastern University alumni
Big Brother (American TV series) contestants
People from Tallahassee, Florida
American osteopathic physicians
American dermatologists